Dufourea is a genus of mostly foliose lichen species in the subfamily Xanthorioideae of the family Teloschistaceae. Species in the genus are mostly found in the Southern Hemisphere.

Taxonomy
The genus was originally circumscribed by Swedish lichenologist Erik Acharius in Johann Albert Luyken's 1809 publication Tentamen historiae lichenum, although he did not assign any species to the genus. The following year, Acharius included Dufourea in his influential work Lichenographia Universalis and included six species. Luyken had studied under Acharius in Sweden and had access to Acharius's work before it was published; because his text about the genus is a partial transcription of Acharius's work (and he acknowledged Acharius), Acharius is credited as the author of the name as well as the description.  All six species that Acharius included in Dufourea are now classified in different genera. A type species for the genus, Dufourea flammea, was selected by Giuseppe De Notaris in 1846. The genus was resurrected for use in 2013 following a large-scale molecular phylogenetic analysis of the family Teloschistaceae. Dufourea species are grouped in a clade with a sister taxon relationship to genus Xanthoria.

The generic name Dufourea honours  French medical doctor and naturalist Léon Jean Marie (or Jean-Marie Léon) Dufour (1780–1865).

Description
Dufourea lichens occur in the Southern Hemisphere, with several species from South Africa and Australia. Most species are foliose (bushy) and relatively large, and lack true rhizines, although some species have short rhizine-like structures.

Species
, Species Fungorum accepts 18 species of Dufourea.

Dufourea africana 
Dufourea alexanderbaai 
Dufourea angustata 
Dufourea australis 
Dufourea bonae-spei 
Dufourea capensis 
Dufourea dissectula 
Dufourea doidgeae 
Dufourea elixii 
Dufourea filsonii 
Dufourea flammea 
Dufourea incavata 
Dufourea inflata 
Dufourea karrooensis 
Dufourea ligulata 
Dufourea marlothii 
Dufourea ottolangei 
Dufourea physcioides 
Dufourea sipmanii 
Dufourea streimannii 
Dufourea turbinata 
Dufourea volkmarwirthii 

Former species;
 D. arctica  = Dactylina arctica, Parmeliaceae family
 D. ceratites  = Siphula ceratites, Icmadophilaceae
 D. collodes  = Cladia aggregata, Cladoniaceae
 D. flabellata  = Bunodophoron flabellatum, Sphaerophoraceae
 D. hirsuta  = Langeottia hirsuta, Teloschistaceae
 D. inanis  = Cenozosia inanis, Ramalinaceae
 D. madreporiformis  = Allocetraria madreporiformis, Parmeliaceae
 D.  mollusca  = Combea mollusca, Opegraphaceae
 D. ryssolea  = Xanthoparmelia ryssolea, Parmeliaceae
 D. tortuosa  = Peltula tortuosa, Peltulaceae

References

Teloschistales
Lichen genera
Teloschistales genera
Taxa described in 1809
Taxa named by Erik Acharius